Point England is a suburb of Auckland, New Zealand. It is under the local governance of the Auckland Council.

Demographics

Point England had a population of 4,923 at the 2018 New Zealand census, an increase of 618 people (14.4%) since the 2013 census, and an increase of 696 people (16.5%) since the 2006 census. There were 1,323 households, comprising 2,361 males and 2,559 females, giving a sex ratio of 0.92 males per female. The median age was 29.0 years (compared with 37.4 years nationally), with 1,347 people (27.4%) aged under 15 years, 1,200 (24.4%) aged 15 to 29, 1,872 (38.0%) aged 30 to 64, and 507 (10.3%) aged 65 or older.

Ethnicities were 27.0% European/Pākehā, 26.5% Māori, 52.8% Pacific peoples, 13.2% Asian, and 2.4% other ethnicities. People may identify with more than one ethnicity.

The percentage of people born overseas was 33.7, compared with 27.1% nationally.

Although some people chose not to answer the census's question about religious affiliation, 29.6% had no religion, 53.0% were Christian, 3.3% had Māori religious beliefs, 1.1% were Hindu, 2.7% were Muslim, 2.6% were Buddhist and 1.3% had other religions.

Of those at least 15 years old, 402 (11.2%) people had a bachelor's or higher degree, and 924 (25.8%) people had no formal qualifications. The median income was $18,900, compared with $31,800 nationally. 231 people (6.5%) earned over $70,000 compared to 17.2% nationally. The employment status of those at least 15 was that 1,386 (38.8%) people were employed full-time, 426 (11.9%) were part-time, and 306 (8.6%) were unemployed.

History 
Ngāti Pāoa established a foothold along the western side of the Tamaki River and at Mokoia (present day Panmure) in around 1780. Extensive settlement and agriculture by Ngāti Pāoa in the Mokoia area was recorded by the missionaries John Butler and Samuel Marsden around 1820. Mokoia was a significant settlement in the region. Butler estimated four thousand inhabitants.  When Butler climbed what was Maungarei / Mount Wellington he saw twenty villages in the valley below and "with a single glance, beheld the greatest portion of cultivated land I had ever met within one place in New Zealand." Marsden stated that "Their houses are superior to most I've met with. Their stores were full of potatoes containing some thousands of baskets and they had some very fine hogs.”

Further evidence of active settlement in the area was noted by Captain D'Urville in 1827, on his second visit to New Zealand, when he engaged with Ngāti Paoa chiefs Tawhiti and Te Rangui at the entrance to the Tāmaki River. D'Urville was led along Te Tō Waka, the canoe portage at Ōtāhuhu toward the Manukau, and noted that on the eastern side of the Tāmaki, they "saw the village of Ourouroa and a number of canoes with a great many inhabitants." On his return, he witnessed that “crowds of natives were looking for shellfish in the mud and the rocks at the entrance were covered with men fishing.” 

Between 1836 and 1839, Ngāti Paoa was among five iwi negotiating transactions with a missionary for a large block in Tamaki which allowed Maori to occupy the land without conflict. In 1837, missionaries noted on the back of one of the deeds that in selling the land, iwi would retain the use of at least one third of the block, around 83,000 acres. Sixteen Ngāti Paoa rangatira signed the Treaty of Waitangi at Karaka Bay at the entrance of the Tamaki River on 4 March 1840.  In 1842, the Crown granted 5,500 acres to the missionaries and retained the remainder of the land.  Following protest, some of the land was returned to Māori, however, Ngāti Paoa did not receive land or compensation and were not permitted to remain on the land set aside for their use in 1837.

In the 1920s, Point England was under consideration as the site of an air base but this initiative was eventually abandoned due to the cost of the land.  At the time, the land had been subdivided and the cost of a quarter acre was around £450. In 1935, a proposal to establish an airport on 244 acres at the eastern end of Point England Road was proposed as it was only eight miles from the Auckland central Post Office. At a meeting of Auckland metropolitan local authorities in May 1938, a decision was to abandon the Point England site for one at Manukau harbour.

On 20 March, 2021, the Crown and Ngāti Paoa signed a Deed of Settlement. In its settlement with Ngāti Paoa, the crown acknowledged that the iwi had contributed to the establishment and development of New Zealand and that it took land in the Tāmaki block in which Ngāti Paoa had interests without compensation.

Education

Redevelopment 
Point England is included in the redevelopment area of the Tamaki Regeneration Company.  The company is jointly owned by the government and Auckland Council, and was formed in 2014 with strategic objectives of social transformation, economic development and increased housing availability.  The initiative aims to transform the Tamaki area over 15-20 years.    The population of the area is expected to double when the existing social housing has been demolished and replaced.

References

Suburbs of Auckland
Populated places on the Tāmaki River